Critical social thought is an interdisciplinary academic major offered at several liberal arts colleges. It addresses the fundamental questions about social life and embraces the contours of modern experience and the historical forces that have helped to shape that experience. It examines the prevailing and oppositional currents of thought; cultural representations as well as the technologies of their production and dissemination; the tensions between power and freedom, individuality and society, truth and uncertainty, creativity and order. Examples of topical concentrations include: Architecture and the social organization of space, disenchantment, peace and conflict, racial and ethnic identities, the Western canon and its critics.

The program treats common sense and conventional beliefs as points of departure rather than as predetermined points of arrival. It also supports questioning the taken-for-granted regardless of the political angle from which that questioning takes place. While critical social thought introduces a broad range of established critical genres, it also encourages imaginative thinking through synthesis and bridging tendencies of thought.

See also
Academic major
Undergraduate degree

Philosophy education
Critical theory